The Story of Us may refer to:

The Story of Us (film), 1999 U.S. film
"The Story of Us" (song), 2010 song by American singer-songwriter Taylor Swift
The Story of Us (TV series), 2016 Filipino television series
America: The Story of Us, 2010 U.S. documentary-drama television miniseries
Australia: The Story of Us, 2015 Australian documentary-drama television miniseries
 Canada: The Story of Us, 2017 Canadian documentary-drama television miniseries
 The Story of Us with Morgan Freeman, 2017 documentary television series
"The Story of Us", song by Charlotte Church from Back to Scratch
"The Story of Us", an album by Quinn XCII
"Story of Us", song by Tinashe from Songs for You